Cañizo, full name: Cañizo de Campos, is a municipality located in the province of Zamora, Castile and León, Spain. According to the 2009 census (INE), the municipality has a population of 276 inhabitants.

References

Municipalities of the Province of Zamora